Matías José Guardia Torres (born 5 March 1991 in Mendoza, Argentina) is an Argentine association footballer who currently plays for Iberia in the Primera B de Chile.

Teams
  Independiente Rivadavia 2010-2012
  Gutiérrez SC 2012-2013
  Leonardo Murialdo 2013-2014
  Huracán Las Heras 2014-2015
  Unión La Calera 2015
  Huracán Las Heras 2016
  Iberia 2016–present

External links
 
 
 

1991 births
Living people
Argentine footballers
Argentine expatriate footballers
Independiente Rivadavia footballers
Unión La Calera footballers
Deportes Iberia footballers
Primera B de Chile players
Chilean Primera División players
Expatriate footballers in Chile
Association football forwards
Expatriate footballers in Guatemala
Sportspeople from Mendoza, Argentina